was the lead ship of twenty-four s, built for the Imperial Japanese Navy following World War I. When introduced into service, these ships were the most powerful destroyers in the world. They served as first-line destroyers through the 1930s, and remained formidable weapons systems well into the Pacific War. Fubuki was a veteran of many of the major battles of the first year of the war, and was sunk in Ironbottom Sound during the Battle of Cape Esperance in World War II.

History
Construction of the advanced Fubuki-class destroyers was authorized as part of the Imperial Japanese Navy's expansion program from fiscal year 1923, intended to give Japan a qualitative edge with the world's most modern ships. The Fubuki class had performance that was a quantum leap over previous destroyer designs, so much so that they were designated . The large size, powerful engines, high speed, large radius of action and unprecedented armament gave these destroyers the firepower similar to many light cruisers in other navies. Fubuki, built at the Maizuru Naval Arsenal was laid down on 19 June 1926, launched on 15 November 1927 and commissioned on 10 August 1928. Originally assigned hull designation "Destroyer No. 35", she was completed as Fubuki.

World War II service
At the time of the attack on Pearl Harbor, Fubuki was assigned to Destroyer Division 11 of Destroyer Squadron 3 of the IJN 1st Fleet, and had deployed from Kure Naval District to Hainan Island. Sagiri was sunk by Dutch submarine  near Kuching on 24 December 1941.

Fubuki was next involved in supporting the Malaya operations.

On 13–18 February 1942, Fubuki was assigned to "Operation L", the invasion of Bangka and Palembang, on Sumatra in the Netherlands East Indies, and took part in attacks on Allied shipping fleeing from Singapore. Fubuki assisted in the sinking or capture of at least seven vessels during this operation. On 27 February 1942, Fubuki was assigned to "Operation J", covering forces landing on the western portion of Java. During the Battle of Sunda Strait Perth and Houston were both sunk. Fubuki has often been accused of launching the torpedo spread that accidentally sank four Japanese transports and a minesweeper during this battle, but recent research indicates  the cruiser  the more likely agent.

On 12 March 1942, Fubuki was part of the escort Admiral Jizaburo Ozawa's cover force for "Operation T" (the invasion of northern Sumatra). On 23 March, she escorted Admiral Ozawa's cover force for the "Operation D", the invasion of the Andaman Islands; then she served patrol and escort duties out of Port Blair (Andaman Islands) during the Japanese raids into the Indian Ocean. On 13–22 April she returned from Singapore via Camranh Bay to Kure Naval Arsenal, then docked for maintenance.

On 4–5 June 1942, Fubuki participated in the Battle of Midway as part of the escort for Admiral Isoroku Yamamoto's Main Body. Fubuki provided antiaircraft protection during the American air attacks, which sank  and badly damaged Mogami.

On 30 June–2 July 1942, Fubuki escorted a troop convoy from Kure to Amami-Ōshima, then conducted antisubmarine patrols there. On 17–31 July, Fubuki sailed from Amami-Ōshima via Mako, Singapore and Sabang to Mergui (Burma) for Indian Ocean raiding operations, which were aborted due to the American invasion of Guadalcanal. On 8–17 August, Fubuki went from Mergui via Makassar to Davao. On 19–23 August, she escorted a troop transport convoy from Davao to Truk, and was then sent into the Solomon Islands theater of operations. On 27–31 August, she escorted the transport Sado Maru from Rabaul to the Shortland Islands, followed by a pair of "Tokyo Express" troop transport run to Guadalcanal. On 2 September, Fubuki was part of the force which bombarded Henderson Field at Guadalcanal, as cover for the  troop transport run. There was another troop transport run on 5 September and another attack mission on 8 September. On 12–13 September, Fubuki provided gunfire support against US Marine positions on Guadalcanal in support of the Kawaguchi offensive. This was followed by five more troop transport runs to Guadalcanal on 13 September, 16 September, 1 October, 4 October and 7 October.

On 11 October 1942, in the Battle of Cape Esperance, Fubukis luck finally ran out. She was sunk by gunfire of a US cruiser/destroyer group, off Cape Esperance at position . However, Fubuki’s captain, Lieutenant Commander Shizuo Yamashita was killed in action.

Fubuki was struck from the navy list on 15 November 1942.

Wreck
The wreck of Fubuki was located in January 2015 by RV Petrel during its survey of Ironbottom Sound. She sits upright in 1,301 meters (4,268 feet) of water.

Notes

References

External links
Fubuki in Naval History of World Wars
 Muir, Dan Order of Battle - The Battle of the Sunda Strait 1942

Further reading

Fubuki-class destroyers
Ships built by Maizuru Naval Arsenal
1927 ships
World War II destroyers of Japan
Shipwrecks in Ironbottom Sound
Maritime incidents in October 1942
2015 archaeological discoveries